Le Haut-Richelieu Regional County Municipality (Upper Richelieu) is a regional county municipality in the Montérégie region in southwestern Quebec, Canada. Its seat is in Saint-Jean-sur-Richelieu. It is named for the Richelieu River which runs south-north through it.

Subdivisions
There are 14 subdivisions within the RCM:

Cities & Towns (1)
 Saint-Jean-sur-Richelieu

Municipalities (12)
 Clarenceville
 Henryville
 Lacolle
 Mont-Saint-Grégoire
 Noyan
 Saint-Alexandre
 Saint-Blaise-sur-Richelieu
 Saint-Paul-de-l'Île-aux-Noix
 Saint-Sébastien
 Saint-Valentin
 Sainte-Brigide-d'Iberville
 Venise-en-Québec

Parishes (1)
 Sainte-Anne-de-Sabrevois

Demographics

Population

Language

Transportation

Access Routes
Highways and numbered routes that run through the municipality, including external routes that start or finish at the county border:

 Autoroutes
 

 Principal Highways
 
 

 Secondary Highways
 
 
 
 
 
 

 External Routes

See also
 List of regional county municipalities and equivalent territories in Quebec

References

 
Census divisions of Quebec